Suleika (minor planet designation: 563 Suleika) is a minor planet orbiting the Sun. Previously designated as 1905 QK, it was discovered by German astronomer Paul Götz on 6 April 1905 from Heidelberg, Germany.

The planet was named after a female character in Nietzsche's Also sprach Zarathustra.

Photometric observations of this asteroid at the Oakley Observatory in Terre Haute, Indiana, during 2006 gave a light curve with a period of 5.628 ± 0.002 hours and a brightness variation of 0.28 ± 0.01 in magnitude.

References

External links 
 
 

000563
Discoveries by Paul Götz
Named minor planets
000563
000563
19050406